The Anglican Diocese of Ideato is one of twelve within the Anglican Province of Owerri, Nigeria. It is one of the fourteen provinces within the Church of Nigeria. The diocese was created out of the then Okigwe-Orlu Diocese in 1999. The current bishop is Henry Okeke; he was translated from Mbamili in 2020.

History 
On 12 July 1999, the Diocese of Ideato was established, marking the return of the headquarters status of St. Peter's Church which was shifted to Nkwerre in 1921.

Special Churches 
The Cathedral is St. Peter's Cathedral in Arondizuogu which is the main headquarters of the Anglican Diocese of Ideato.

Leadership

See also 
Anglicanism

References 

Dioceses of the Province of Owerri
Church of Nigeria dioceses